Samuel Plummer Morrill (February 11, 1816 – August 4, 1892) was a nineteenth-century politician and minister from Maine.

Born in Chesterville, Massachusetts (now in Maine), Morrill attended common schools as a child and later attended Farmington Academy in Farmington, Maine. He studied theology, was ordained a minister and held pastorates in Farmington from 1848 to 1853. He was elected register of deeds of Franklin County, Maine in 1857 and was reelected to the position in 1862. Morrill was elected a Republican to the United States House of Representatives in 1868, serving from 1869 to 1871, being unsuccessful for renomination in 1870. Afterward, he resumed ministerial duties in East Dixfield, Maine from 1877 to 1879, moved to Vienna, Maine in 1885 and retired from ministry in 1886. Morrill died in Chesterville, Maine on August 4, 1892, and was interred in Chesterville Hill Cemetery in Chesterville.

External links

1816 births
1892 deaths
American Christian clergy
People from Franklin County, Maine
19th-century Christian clergy
County officials in Maine
Republican Party members of the United States House of Representatives from Maine
19th-century American politicians
People from Vienna, Maine
19th-century American clergy